Paul Adrian Taylor (born 9 March 1939) is a former English cricketer.  Taylor was a left-handed batsman who bowled left-arm fast-medium.  He was born at Kirkby-in-Ashfield, Nottinghamshire.

Taylor made his first-class debut for Nottinghamshire against Middlesex in the 1958 County Championship.  He made five further first-class appearances for the county, all of which came in that season, with his final appearance coming against Surrey.  In his six first-class appearances for the county, he took 7 wickets at an average of 47.85, with best figures of 2/82.  With the bat, he scored 34 runs at a batting average of 6.80, with a high score of 13.

References

External links
Paul Taylor at ESPNcricinfo
Paul Taylor at CricketArchive

1939 births
Living people
People from Kirkby-in-Ashfield
Cricketers from Nottinghamshire
English cricketers
Nottinghamshire cricketers